Long Island Business News (LIBN) is a weekly business journal based in Ronkonkoma, New York. Launched in 1953 as the Long Island Commercial Review, LIBN covers business, government, legal, nonprofit and health care issues in Long Island's two counties, Nassau County and Suffolk County.

In addition to the weekly paper, LIBN maintains a Web site featuring news and several business blogs. The company also publishes lists of Long Island companies as well as several issue-centered books such as its annual Green Guide and 40 Under 40 Awards guide.

History 
In 1953 newspaper reporter Arthur Hug and the husband-and-wife team of Peg and John Whitmore launched Long Island Commercial Review. Hug had been a reporter at the Nassau Daily Review-Star, the leading newspaper on Long Island in the 1930s. Several years later, he accepted an offer to write for Newsday. Hug also served as a copy editor for World Telegram & Sun shortly before it folded.

The Hug and Whitmore team published the first paper on September 14, 1953. An issue sold for 15 cents, and a yearly subscription cost $5. The Commercial Review was known as the official publication of the Long Island Association, but it always remained independent.

References

http://www.libn.com/article.htm?articleID=30925
http://findarticles.com/p/articles/mi_qn4189
https://www.nytimes.com/2003/09/28/nyregion/li-work-long-island-business-news-50-years-of-change.html
http://www.mondotimes.com/1/world/us/32/1885/4532
https://web.archive.org/web/20070817014618/http://www.bizpubs.org/pubDetail.asp?id=79
http://www.pcli.org
http://www.nytimes.com/2003/09/28/nyregion/li-work-long-island-business-news-50-years-of-change.html
https://web.archive.org/web/20110318050942/http://www.liwa.org/newsandevents/event.phtml?ID=751
http://libn.com/contact-us/

External links
Long Island Business News

Business newspapers published in the United States
Newspapers established in 1953
Weekly newspapers published in the United States
1953 establishments in New York (state)
Gannett publications